Yusefabad (also Romanized as Yūsefābād and Yūsefābad; also known as Yūsaofābād) is a village in Eshaqabad Rural District, Zeberkhan District, Nishapur County, Razavi Khorasan Province, Iran. At the 2006 census, its population was 648, in 183 families.

References 

Populated places in Nishapur County